Scooby-Doo! and the Curse of the 13th Ghost is a 2019 American animated direct-to-video comedy mystery film produced by Warner Bros. Animation and distributed by Warner Bros. Home Entertainment, and the thirty-second entry in the direct-to-video series of Scooby-Doo films. The film is a continuation of the 1985 animated television series The 13 Ghosts of Scooby-Doo, designed to provide a conclusion to the show's unfinished storyline. The film was released on DVD and digital on February 5, 2019.

Plot 
A prologue set before The 13 Ghosts of Scooby-Doo depicts a young Vincent Van Ghoul and his partner Mortifer hunting down and successfully sealing the final ghost into the Chest of Demons. Mortifer, however, is attacked and seemingly killed by minion ghosts as a tearful Vincent makes his escape. In the opening credits, Vincent recaps the events of The 13 Ghosts of Scooby-Doo in which the titular dog eventually set the ghosts free once more but would catch all but one with the help of his friends Daphne and Shaggy.

In the present day at Old Timey Toys, Mystery Inc. is forced to retire from solving mysteries after catching a teenager-fearing Farmer Morgan and largely due to the ungrateful Sheriff telling them they could be arrested for "criminal negligence". In addition, Old Timey Toys' owner Mrs. Malvo was handcuffed outside for trying to stop a deal with Farmer Morgan.

The following day, they hold a garage sale and sell items from their old mysteries, even the Mystery Machine, leaving Fred depressed. They then discover the crystal ball that Daphne, Shaggy, and Scooby used to contact Van Ghoul during their ghost recapturing adventures. At that moment, their old friend Van Ghoul contacts the gang about the final ghost. Daphne fills Fred and a skeptical Velma in, and unveils the red van dubbed the Misstery Machine, and the gang start on their journey to meet Van Ghoul.

On their way to his estate, they are chased by a phantom car but Daphne manages to skillfully outmaneuver it. Seeing Daphne take charge only furthers Fred's existential crisis as he feels he is without a role. The gang meet Van Ghoul, but are all attacked by the thirteenth ghost: a hulking, winged demon-like creature named Asmodeus. Shaggy reveals that he sent the chest to Van Ghoul's residence in the Himalayas and the gang travels there using a flying boat.

Upon arrival, they spot Bernie Alan who inquired about the crystal ball at the garage sale. Daphne, Van Ghoul, Scooby, and Shaggy tail him but are attacked by the phantom car again which uses its revving engine to create an avalanche. Vincent reveals he is unable to use his magic and the four crash into a temple. Meanwhile, Fred and Velma search a seemingly abandoned post office and unknowingly meet an adult Flim-Flam who tries to sell them Chest of Demons merchandise and ghost-catching equipment. They leave but are snatched up by something even Velma cannot explain and she comes to the conclusion that it must have been real ghosts.

Asmodeus had been waiting for Van Ghoul and chases the four when they find the chest. Van Ghoul breaks his crystal ball and somehow transports the kids outside the temple where they meet Velma and Fred. Fred cheers for his despondent team and a restored Daphne conducts a plan.

Velma visits Flim-Flam's store and takes everything. She, Fred, and Flim-Flam are once again pursued by the phantom car but are able to evade capture with the Mystery Machine's upgrades installed. Daphne, Shaggy, and Scooby infiltrate the castle to help Van Ghoul and reunite with Flim-Flam, Velma, and Fred. They find Van Ghoul defeated. He reveals that Asmodeus is the demon form of his magically powerful ancestor Asomad Van Ghoul and thus blames the impending doom on himself. Asmodeus opens the Chest of Demons, something that Velma points out as being impossible, as the Chest can only be opened by the living. Asmodeus tries to run but is intercepted by Daphne and revealed as Mortifer, who reveals that he faked his death by casting an illusion. Mortifer wanted to sell the Chest to Alan for $10 million, but Alan reveals himself as an international agent named Vance Linklater and arrests Mortifer. However, he begins to escape in the phantom car, only to be recaptured.

A visage of the real Asmodeus and Asomad briefly appears. Velma deduces from a tome that the real Asmodeus was actually watching over Van Ghoul and has achieved redemption. However, she fabricated this story to give Van Ghoul closure. She debunks the first twelve ghosts as hallucinations due to the Himalayan thin air and teases opening the real Chest of Demons. However, upon seeing the gang's fearful faces, she decides not to. Daphne decides the gang should continue solving mysteries.

Voice cast 
 Frank Welker as Fred Jones and Scooby-Doo
 Grey Griffin as Daphne Blake
 Matthew Lillard as Shaggy Rogers
 Kate Micucci as Velma Dinkley
 Maurice LaMarche as Vincent Van Ghoul, Bernie Alan and Vance Linklater
 Noshir Dalal as Flim Flam
 Nolan North as Asmodeus, Mortifer and Farmer Morgan
 David Herman as The Sheriff

References

External links 
 

2010s English-language films
2010s American animated films
2010s supernatural films
2019 animated films
2019 films
2010s children's animated films
Films based on television series
Films produced by Sam Register
American ghost films
Warner Bros. Animation animated films
Scooby-Doo direct-to-video animated films
2019 direct-to-video films
American children's animated comedy films
American children's animated mystery films
American mystery films
Warner Bros. direct-to-video animated films
Films directed by Cecilia Aranovich